This article aims at showing the ranking of all clubs contested at Girabola, since its first edition in 1979:

Girabola Club Rankings (1980s)

Colour codes:
 Rankings in the green colour mean the club has been promoted
 Rankings in the red colour mean the club has been relegated
 Rankings in the purple colour mean the club has been promoted and relegated in the same season

Girabola Club Rankings (1990s)

Colour codes:
 Rankings in the green colour mean the club has been promoted
 Rankings in the red colour mean the club has been relegated
 Rankings in the purple colour mean the club has been promoted and relegated in the same season

Girabola Club Rankings (2000s)

Colour codes:
 Rankings in the green colour mean the club has been promoted
 Rankings in the red colour mean the club has been relegated
 Rankings in the purple colour mean the club has been promoted and relegated in the same season

See also
Girabola Seasons

References

rankings